This is a list of the alternative versions of Wonder Woman from all media, including DC Comics multiverse, Elseworlds, television and film.

Mainstream
Queen Hippolyta became Wonder Woman and joined the Justice Society (who made her their secretary) around World War II in post-Crisis on Infinite Earths continuity. In pre-Crisis on Infinite Earths continuity, Hippolyta assumed the mantle of Wonder Woman for one adventure in Sensation Comics #26. This happens again in Infinite Frontier #1 (2021), when Hippolyta embraces her daughter's mantle and place on the Justice League.
Artemis became Wonder Woman during Hippolyta's trials for a new Wonder Woman.
Orana, a character similar to Artemis, defeated Diana in a new contest and became Wonder Woman in pre-Crisis on Infinite Earths continuity. She died during her first mission.
Nubia was Wonder Woman's pre-Crisis twin sister, who has also laid claim to the title of Wonder Woman. Post-Crisis she became "Nu'Bia", a Wonder Woman who preceded Diana historically.
Cassandra Sandsmark, the current Wonder Girl, became Wonder Woman in an alternative future as seen in the "Titans Tomorrow" story arc in Teen Titans (vol. 3) #14-16.
Donna Troy was Wonder Woman in the first "Who is Wonder Woman?" story arc in Wonder Woman (vol. 3) before Diana came back. In her most recent continuity, Donna herself was originally created as a younger, magical duplicate of Diana.
Yara Flor becomes Wonder Woman after the events of Dark Nights: Death Metal. When Wonder Woman goes missing Yara Flor appears in the Amazon rainforest as her replacement.

Alternative universe depictions
 Earth-1, the Silver Age Wonder Woman, was reintroduced during DC's Convergence Crossover. Here she interacted with the Joker from Earth-43. Etta Candy and Steve both perish during the crossover leaving Diana alone once Telos returns her home. 
 Earth-2 is traditionally home to the "Golden Age" Wonder Woman, and a new Earth-2 was introduced following 52, depicting the adventures of the generation of heroes which followed Wonder Woman's. Following The New 52 reboot (2011), in the comic book Earth 2 (2012–2015), Wonder Woman died alongside Superman and Batman in an invasion of Earth-2. In flashbacks and in depictions such as in Batman/Superman (2014), she is shown to have ridden a pegasus and lived on Paradise Island. Her daughter by the evil New God Steppenwolf, Fury, appears frequently in Earth 2 and related books.
 On Earth-3, the character was known as "Superwoman'" and was a member of the Crime Society of America, analogous to the Justice Society of America. Unlike her standard Amazonian counterpart, the Earth-3 Wonder Woman apparently possessed uncharacteristic abilities such as heat vision. During the Convergence crossover, Superwoman was captured and sentenced to death in the year they were trapped on Telos. She was rescued and joined the side of villains before being returned to Earth-3. Following the New 52 reboot, Superwoman again appears to be an Amazon Lois Lane/Wonder Woman; Wonder Woman of Earth-0's lasso has no effect on her. She and her Crime Syndicate enslave Earth-0 for a time, until they are defeated by Earth-0's Lex Luthor. She is later taken captive by A.R.G.U.S., but plots for her unborn child by Earth-3's Alexander Luthor to wreak havoc at a later date. During the Darkseid War, Superwoman gives birth to the child before being brutally murdered. Her child becomes to new avatar for Darkseid. 
 The Wonder Woman that appeared in Tangent Comics was a genetically engineered alien developed to bridge the gaps between two warring alien species: one with brute strength, the other with psionic powers. This Wonder Woman possessed both abilities. This version of Wonder Woman has been depicted as existing on Earth-9 of the revised DC Multiverse.
 Several Nazi-themed versions of Wonder Woman have been shown over variations of the Earth-10 concept. Most recently, following the Flashpoint (2011) reboot, Earth-10's Wonder Woman is shown as the Valkyrie Brunhilde, blonde and formidable and a member of Overman's Reichsmen in The Multiversity - Mastermen (2015).
 Earth-11's version of Wonder Woman was "Wonder Man", who was referred to by Superwoman as "Dane". More violent and aggressive than his feminine counterparts, Wonder Man was expelled from the JLA for his unrepentant stance on executing Maxwell Lord. He went on to lead his brothers, the Amazonians, in an attack on the modern world. Following the Flashpoint (2011) reboot, Earth-11's gender-reversed Wonder Woman is Wonderous Man, as shown in The Multiversity Guidebook (2015).
 On Earth-15, it was shown that Diana had died, and that Donna Troy had replaced her as Wonder Woman. The character debuted in Countdown #30 (2007).
 In the DC/Marvel crossover event JLA/Avengers, Wonder Woman appeared in the present Justice League during the battle with Terminus in Keystone City and also managed to catch the Ultimate Nullifier before the Avengers arrived and sent them back to their universe. When Diana and Aquaman went to the city of Asgard in the Marvel Universe, she viciously attacked the Avengers' Hercules, believing he raped this universe's Hippolyta as the Heracles of her universe had. She participated in the hunt for the 12 artifacts before Krona attacked both The Grandmaster and Galactus and merged the two universes. While seeing the true realities, Diana witnessed her mother's death, but decided to continue to fight off Krona. Near the end of the battle with Krona's forces, this Wonder Woman, She-Hulk, and another version of Hippolyta as Wonder Woman stayed to defend the path against the villains left behind by the army of heroes. During the encounter it was revealed that she passes the worthiness test to wield Mjolnir, the enchanted hammer wielded by the Asgardian Avenger Thor.
 The Amalgam Comics universe merged Wonder Woman with the X-Men member Storm, as the character Amazon.
 The Justice Riders Elseworlds limited series presented a version of Wonder Woman who was a marshal operating in the Wild West. This alternative Wonder Woman lived on Earth-18.
 The DC: The New Frontier limited series presented a Wonder Woman who was similar to the 1950s incarnation of the character. This alternative Wonder Woman lived on Earth-21.
 The Kingdom Come limited series featured an alternative Wonder Woman who was similar to the mainstream version. Having been created immortal by the gods, she retained her youth despite the passage of decades, and may have been romantically involved with a middle-aged Superman. In ‘’Thy Kingdom Come’’ arc of Justice Society of America, Wonder Woman is shown to have various children with Superman. This alternative Wonder Woman lived on Earth-22.
 "Superman: Red Son" depicted a reality where Superman's spaceship landed in Russia rather than the United States, and Wonder Woman served as ambassador to Superman's Soviet Union. She fell in love with Superman (who remained unaware of her attraction to him), but she eventually became disillusioned when he became a dictator. She eventually raised an army to stop him, but she was defeated. This alternative Wonder Woman lived on Earth-30.
 Wonder Woman was referenced in The Dark Knight Returns as having exiled herself back to her homeland after superheroes became outlawed. In The Dark Knight Strikes Again, she remained an ageless beauty, and with Superman she had an Amazon–Kryptonian hybrid daughter, Lara. Her costume was slightly different, with a skirt and with a nose guard built into her tiara. She, Superman and Captain Marvel had become reluctant agents of Lex Luthor until Batman led a revolution against his regime. In Dark Knight III: The Master Race, Diana has once again returned to Themyscira where she is mothering Jonathan, her second child with Superman.
 Miller claimed this is the same character that appears in All Star Batman and Robin #5, wherein she was depicted as much more aggressive and misandristic than every other notable version. She was a founding member of this universe's Justice League, along with Superman, Hal Jordan, and Plastic Man. She had a heated argument with them at one point over how to deal with Batman. The argument ended in a sudden kiss with Superman (even as she insisted that she hated him).
 The Wonder Woman: Amazonia limited series depicted an alternative version of Diana who was born during the 19th century at a time when Jack the Ripper gained control of the British Empire. She was snatched away from Paradise Island by Captain Steven Trevor and the Royal Marines. She was forced to marry Trevor and became the star of a London theatrical show, reenacting tales of women from the Bible. She eventually showed herself to be a great heroine, freeing oppressed women from all over the Empire and taking on the terrible reign of King Jack. This alternative Wonder Woman lived on Earth-34. This version was later chosen by Monarch in Countdown: Arena (2007) to be a part of his strike team.
 The Wildstorm Universe of Earth-50 was once home to its own counterparts of the JLA, who appeared in the series Planetary. This Wonder Woman possessed shapeshifting bracelets. In Stormwatch, it was shown that Apollo and Midnighter were once the Superman and Batman near-counterparts on a team which also carried a Wonder Woman counterpart, called "Amaze". She was killed in her first mission.
 In addition, another alternative Diana appeared as one of the main protagonists in Planetary/JLA: Terra Occulta, which took place in an alternative history, where among other differences, Jakita Wagner destroyed Themyscira and killed all of the Amazons residing there. In the book's finale, Diana avenged her people by defeating Wagner and killing her partner, Elijah Snow.
 Final Crisis #7 depicted a reality where Wonder Woman was of African descent and was named "Nubia". She was later revealed to be the Wonder Woman of Earth-23 in Action Comics vol. 2 #9.
 An alternative version Wonder Woman based on the Bizarro character named "Bizarra" was introduced first in DC Comics Presents #71, then later in Action Comics #856 and 857. Bizarra was later shown to be working for the villain Monarch in Lord Havok and the Extremists #3. An earlier animated version of the character was shown on the 1985 television series The Super Powers Team: Galactic Guardians in the episode "The Bizarro Super Powers Team". In the episode, she was called "Bizzaro Wonder Woman" and was voiced by B.J. Ward.
 The DC One Million Wonder Woman was a marble statue granted life by the Goddess of Truth. She had similar powers to the original and also carried two shape-changing weapons similar in nature to Diana's invisible jet. They typically acted as her sentient bracelets and were named Charity and Harmony. She operated from Venus.
 In the alternative timeline shown in the Flashpoint miniseries, Wonder Woman wages a war against Aquaman and the Atlanteans. As a young girl, Diana met and befriended a young Arthur Curry. When they reach adulthood, they agree to a Marriage of convenience, wherein they will reveal their societies to the world at large together. On the day of their wedding, Hippolyta was killed by a spear thrown by an Atlantean. Unbeknownst to the bride or groom, Hippolyta's death was part of a scheme concocted by Ocean Master, Artemis and Wonder Woman's aunt, Penthesileia, to prevent the union of Aquaman and Wonder Woman (Diana was the intended target, but Hippolyta got in the way). In retaliation, Wonder Woman declares war on Atlantis. Aquaman and the Atlanteans then visit Themyscira to negotiate for peace, but Artemis has bombs dropped on Themyscira, with Wonder Woman angrily believing the Atlanteans were behind it. Wonder Woman's only option is to destroy Themyscira and then escape on the Amazon's invisible planes. She then leads the Amazons in conquering the United Kingdom, renaming it New Themyscira. Wonder Woman later catches Steve Trevor with her Lasso of Truth and begins interrogating him after he is temporarily able to resist the lasso's effects. Steve explains that he was hired to extract Lois Lane from New Themyscira because she was sent to gather information on the Amazons for Cyborg. Wonder Woman states that their counterspy was telling something similar to Cyborg's amassing of superhumans to stop the fighting between her and Aquaman. Her subjects ask her what to do with Steve. Later, Wonder Woman attacks the Resistance member Penny Black, but Penny shows her that people were imprisoned of internment by her aunt Penthesileia. Wonder Woman is furious and frees the people from internment, which she believes that they are not accepted for prison. During this same period, the Amazonian Furies attack the reinforcements of a group of Atlanteans sent to kill Terra, who was being used to keep New Themyscira in the air; Wonder Woman personally joins the battle, confronting the leader, Aquaman. During their struggle, she tells Aquaman that they have both been deceived, when she discovers that her aunt Penthesileia kissing Ocean Master are both responsible for the war between the Atlanteans and the Amazons, that was a ruse planned by them. While the Atlanteans are going to surface, but their attack having been backfired by Ocean Master, Aquaman believes Wonder Woman has set a trap. Wonder Woman escapes from Aquaman, who refuses her word. Wonder Woman then contacts the Amazons to defend their home. The battlefield of Wonder Woman and Aquaman are them fighting; however, they are both approached by the Flash and the heroes that are here to stop the war. Wonder Woman is struggled by Kal-El, who intends to attack her at the last battle.
 The Wonder Woman of Wednesday Comics is "the last of the Amazons" and unfamiliar with the world beyond Paradise Island, until she travels there in her dreams. She differs in many details from the mainstream Wonder Woman, and her adventures draw inspiration from Little Nemo in Slumberland.
 The 1980s series Captain Carrot and His Amazing Zoo Crew presented the parallel Earth of "Earth-C-Minus," a world populated by talking animal superheroes that paralleled the mainstream DC Universe. Earth-C-Minus was the home of Wonder Wabbit, a rabbit "Animalzon princess" from "Parrot-Eyes Island," who served with her world's superhero team, the Just'a Lotta Animals.
 The Wonder Woman of the Ame-Comi universe is a younger version of Diana. Initially sheltered by her mother, Princess Diana becomes Wonder Woman for the first time after knocking out her bodyguard, Areto, and stealing her armor in order to repel an invasion from Kasnia.
 The prequel comic to the game Injustice: Gods Among Us sees Wonder Woman joining Superman's Regime after he is tricked by the Joker into killing his wife Lois Lane and their unborn child along with destroying all of Metropolis. An inquiring by the god of war Ares reveals Wonder Woman is secretly in love with Superman and hopes to one day be with him, though out of respect for Lois Lane she keeps her feelings hidden. Near the end of the Year One series she is put into a coma after being caught in the explosion caused by Captain Atom's death. She is out of commission throughout all of Year Two, being taken by her mother to Amazon Island in the hopes she can wake up. The annual of Year Three reveals that even after she healed physically she was placed in an enchanted sleep so she would remain out of the battle between the Insurgency and Regime. In the middle of Year Three she is finally awakened when Hippolyta makes an unknown deal with Hera. When the Greek Gods demand that Superman step down in his regime in Year Four, Wonder Woman finds her loyalties to the Regime and the gods tested. In the beginning of Year Five Wonder Woman deals with guilt over the indirect role she played in getting the Amazons abandoned by the gods, though she returns to the Regime in time to help recapture villains. However, she disapproves  when Superman decides to recruit notorious super-villains and not give them any say. By the events of the game she is in a relationship with Superman as she has always wanted, but it is implied that Superman does not truly reciprocate her feelings (as he still loves his deceased wife). When she is confronted by her mainstream counterpart, the latter reprimands her for blindly following a man who does not feel as much devotion to her as she does him. Once Wonder Woman is defeated, she is taken away by her fellow Amazons to be imprisoned for her role in the Regime. In Injustice 2 comic reveals that Wonder Woman managed to escape and later lied to Supergirl how Batman had managed to capture Superman and his role in Regime enemy.
In a crossover comic Injustice vs. Masters of the Universe after Superman reformed his Regime, Wonder Woman who is one of his generals leads her own Suicide Squad and has become most brutal and unforgiving villain of the franchise. After Damian Wayne betrays Superman and frees Batman from his control, Wonder Woman kills Damian by snapping his neck in her lasso. Wonder Woman finds herself now cutting a bloody path to He-Man as he's overpowering Superman. She can't bear to lose her leader, especially as she's admitted she's in love with him. En route to Kal-El, she's distracted by a freed Bruce, knowing he's gearing to join the assault on Superman. However, as Diana restrains her former Justice Leaguer, Teela arrives and stabs her in the back, killing her. Diana, in her last breath, actually praises Teela for doing what Bruce never had the guts to do. Later Batman tells Superman that the only way to save Wonder Woman so that she can face justice is to send her to the phantom zone. Superman first disagrees, but He-Man convinces him. After Superman's death and Darkseid defeat, resurrected Diana was imprisoned in the remaining of the orbital intidimadator who is now a new hyper security prison and it is revealed that she is imprisoned alongside Evil-Lyn.
Diana appears in the graphic novel Wonder Woman: The True Amazon. Born through divine intervention of the gods and spoiled as the daughter of Queen Hippolyta and the only child of Themyscira, Diana grows from a privileged child to an arrogant and condescending warrior. She searches the island for lost treasure, defeats and traps monsters inside an enchanted horn, and gains the adoration of the people, adding to her ego. To Diana's confusion and exasperation, however, one Amazon named Alethea, who tends to the horses, does not show her the same adoration. All of Diana's gloating and gifts does nothing to sway Alethea, who is unimpressed by Diana's arrogance. In order to earn her favor, Diana begins helping her in the stables. When a tournament to determine the greatest Amazon comes up, Diana secretly joins in the hope of proving to Alethea once and for all that she is worthy. During the competition Diana discovers for the first time that her fellow amazons are as capable and skilled as she. The final test is a chariot race around the cities, with the winner having to retrieve a tiara first. When Diana is in danger of losing, she unleashes from her horn all the monsters she had trapped in her journeys on the island to create a distraction long enough to win. While it works, she realizes too late that her selfish move has endangered the other racers, who are brutally maimed or killed in an attempt to defeat the monsters, most of which escape back into the island or out into the world. To Diana's despair, Alethea is one of the deaths, having personally fought a beast. Outed as the one responsible for the carnage to her mother, Hippolyta scolds Diana for her selfish, vain ways and disrespecting what Amazons are. Out of guilt and regret, Diana vows to become a selfless and heroic person in honor of Alethea. While many of the amazons want Diana to be brutalized or killed as a result of her actions, one vouches that she be given a less brutal but fitting punishment. Hippolyta thus banishes Diana from Themyscira until she becomes a true hero, giving her Alethea's warrior costume as a sign of penance. Diana leaves the island and a caption reveals she would go on to become a hero after all.

Other Elseworlds and alternative timelines

Superman/Wonder Woman: Whom Gods Destroy: Set in a Nazi-controlled future.
Wonder Woman: The Blue Amazon was the third volume of the Elseworlds trilogy Superman's Metropolis and featured a Diana Prince based on the film The Blue Angel.
 In the Elseworlds story "Superman: Distant Fires", Wonder Woman found a powerless Superman following a nuclear holocaust and brought him to a village inhabited by surviving metahumans. There Billy Batson and Superman vied for her affections. Superman won, and they had a child named Bruce in honor of the late Batman. This led Batson to kill Wonder Woman.
In the Elseworlds 80-Page Giant story "Rockumentary", one of Lex Luthor's musicians was a pop diva named Diana. This version of Wonder Woman was a cross between herself and Madonna.
In Just Imagine, Marvel Comics' Stan Lee and artist Jim Lee reimagined Wonder Woman as Peruvian María Mendoza, reborn as a warrior who wielded a staff forged by Incan gods. Maria is an activist, protesting against the corporate excavation of an ancient holy site near her village. The CEO has a plan: gain power from the site and take over the world. When Maria sneaks onto the site, she finds a large plaque, and agrees to decode it. When she does, two spirits (one of light and one of darkness) come out of the plaque. The light-spirit bonds to Maria, giving her solar-powered abilities. The darkness-spirit bonds to the CEO, turning him into a monster. He vows to destroy the village to retrieve both spirits, then leaves. To save her family, Maria flies to Los Angeles and disguises herself as a normal woman.
DC Comics Bombshells shows a version of Wonder Woman in an alternate history World War II. In the comic, she bases her distinctive attire on the pin-up models on Allied military airplane nose cone art, believing them to be the war goddesses worshiped by the Allied soldiers.
 Written and penciled by Daniel Warren Johnson, the dystopian miniseries Wonder Woman: Dead Earth depicts Wonder Woman being accidentally awaken by a group of survivors from a centuries-long sleep at the Batcave. Diana discovers the Earth reduced to a nuclear wasteland and infested by mutated, insectoid creatures known as Haedras. She saves some of the survivors from a Haedra and finds Bruce Wayne's corpse (still in costume) in the ruins of the upper Wayne Mansion. Having lost her bracelets, Diana keeps the remains of her Wonder Woman suit and Batman's trademark utility belt. She decides to follow the survivors to their colony where she, due to their distrust, is sedated and forced into a gladiator fight against a mutated Cheetah. Diana brings Barbara to consciousness and becomes the survivors' leader with a hopeful speech. She decides to lead the survivors off to Themyscira, believing the island was kept safe from the nuclear war. Much to her horror, Diana finds her homeland devastated and a mutated Hippolyta reveals Themyscira ravaged by radiation which was too weak to kill the Amazons, but caused monstruous body deformations which resulted in the Haedras. Both untrustful and resentful of humanity, Diana gives up on defending human race and leaves with Cheetah and a deformed Pegasus. Through flashbacks, it is revealed Diana was molded and born from both clay and blood from the gods.

References

 Alternative versions
Fictional characters from parallel universes